Associazione Calcio Dilettante Cervia 1920 (formerly known also as Cervia Vodafone) is an Italian football club located in Cervia, Emilia-Romagna. Their colors are blue and yellow.

The team is known in Italy for having been the subject of a reality show on football, named Campioni, il Sogno and broadcast by national channel Italia 1, for their 2004-2005 and 2005-2006 campaigns. The team, who won Eccellenza in 2004-2005 and unsuccessfully played the promotion playoff the following season, was coached by former Italian international and 1982 World Champion Francesco Graziani during this time. Cervia also played in the 2006-2007 Coppa Italia, being defeated 6–0 at the first round by Serie A team Ascoli. Following the closure of the reality show, Cervia did not manage to save from relegation in their second Serie D campaign, and were relegated at the end of the season. They will play Eccellenza in 2007–08.

References

 
Association football clubs established in 1920
Football clubs in Emilia-Romagna
1920 establishments in Italy